Clearwater is a city in Sedgwick County, Kansas, United States.  As of the 2020 census, the population of the city was 2,653.

History
Clearwater was first settled in 1870, then platted as a city in 1872. It was named from the clear water of the river upon which it is situated.  The first post office in Clearwater was established in 1871, and the name of the post office was officially spelled out Clear Water until 1894.  The Chisholm Trail ran along the east side of the community from 1867 to 1871.

Geography
Clearwater is located just southwest of Wichita, Kansas at  (37.505646, -97.501516).

Demographics

2010 census
As of the census of 2010, there were 2,481 people, 908 households, and 660 families residing in the city. The racial makeup of the city was 97.2% White, 0.2% African American, 0.3% Native American, 0.3% Asian, 0.3% from other races, and 1.7% from two or more races. Hispanic or Latino of any race were 1.6% of the population.

There were 908 households, of which 40.9% had children under the age of 18 living with them, 56.1% were married couples living together, 11.5% had a female householder with no husband present, 5.2% had a male householder with no wife present, and 27.3% were non-families. 25.3% of all households were made up of individuals, and 14.2% had someone living alone who was 65 years of age or older. The average household size was 2.65 and the average family size was 3.19.

The median age in the city was 35.8 years. 29.6% of residents were under the age of 18; 7.3% were between the ages of 18 and 24; 24.7% were from 25 to 44; 22% were from 45 to 64; and 16.5% were 65 years of age or older. The gender makeup of the city was 47.1% male and 52.9% female.

2000 census
As of the census of 2000, there were 2,178 people, 773 households, and 609 families residing in the city.  The population density was 750.8/km2 (1,942.7/mi2).  There were 791 housing units at an average density of 272.7 inhabitants/km2 (705.5 inhabitants/mi2).  The racial makeup of the city was 96.42% White, 0.28% African American, 1.24% Native American, 0.41% Asian, 0.05% Pacific Islander, 0.41% from other races, and 1.19% from two or more races.  1.06% of the population were Hispanic or Latino of any race.

There were 773 households, out of which 42.8% had children under the age of 18 living with them, 65.1% were married couples living together, 11.1% had a woman whose husband does not live with her, and 21.1% were non-families. 19.4% of all households were made up of individuals, and 9.1% had someone living alone who was 65 years of age or older.  The average household size was 2.74 and the average family size was 3.15.

In the city, the population was spread out, with 31.7% under the age of 18, 6.5% from 18 to 24, 27.4% from 25 to 44, 19.3% from 45 to 64, and 15.1% who were 65 years of age or older.  The median age was 35 years.  For every 100 females, there were 91.1 males.  For every 100 females age 18 and over, there were 85.6 males.

As of 2000 the median income for a household was $50,694, and the median income for a family was $53,816. Males had a median income of $41,306 versus $28,348 for females. The per capita income for the city was $20,286.  4.3% of the population and 3.5% of families were below the poverty line.  Out of the total people living in poverty, 5.4% were under the age of 18 and 6.0% were 65 or older.

Education
The community is served by Clearwater USD 264 public school district.

Notable people
 Raymond Goertz, roboticist
 Cara Gorges, 2007 Miss Kansas USA
 Pamela Horton, Playboy Playmate of the Month for October 2012.
 Logan Mize, Country Artist

References

Further reading

External links

 City of Clearwater
 Clearwater - Directory of Public Officials
 Clearwater Historical Society
 Clearwater city map, KDOT

Cities in Kansas
Cities in Sedgwick County, Kansas
Wichita, KS Metropolitan Statistical Area
Populated places established in 1870
1870 establishments in Kansas